The 2013 UK Music Video Awards were held on 28 October 2013 at the Queen Elizabeth Hall in Southbank Centre, London and was hosted by Adam Buxton to recognise the best in music videos and music film making from United Kingdom and worldwide.
The nominations were announced on 1 October 2013. American producer and rapper Flying Lotus won Video of the Year for "Until the Quiet Comes" directed by Kahlil Joseph. English director Julien Temple received the Icon Award.

Video of the Year

The Icon Award

Video Genre Categories

Technical

Special Production

Individual

References

External links
Official website

UK Music Video Awards
UK Music Video Awards
UK Music Video Awards